The Castlefield Gallery is an art gallery in Manchester, England, located at 2 Hewitt Street, Knott Mill, Manchester.  The gallery, a resource for contemporary visual artists, was founded by Manchester Artists Studio Association in 1984. The gallery has an exhibition and events programme, provides a professional development scheme for artists in its Project Space and PureScreen screens film and video works.

References

External links

Art museums and galleries in Manchester
1984 establishments in England
Art galleries established in 1984